Armas Rudolf Taipale (27 July 1890 – 9 November 1976) was a Finnish athlete. He competed at the 1912 Summer Olympics and won gold medals in two discus throw events, conventional and two-handed, where the total was counted as a sum of best throws with a left hand and with a right hand. After World War I he won a silver medal in the conventional discus throw at the 1920 Olympics and finished tenth in the shot put. At the 1924 Olympics he competed only in the discus throw and finished in 12th place. Taipale set two unofficial world records in the discus.

Domestically Taipale started competing in 1908 and won three Finnish titles in the discus throw and two in the shot put. In 1914 he was British champion both in the shot put and discus throw. Besides athletics he competed in Greco-Roman wrestling at the Nordic Games and played association football. In 1923 he immigrated to the United States, but returned to Finland in 1974. He was a businessman and lawyer by occupation.

References

1890 births
1976 deaths
Athletes from Helsinki
People from Uusimaa Province (Grand Duchy of Finland)
Finnish male discus throwers
Olympic gold medalists for Finland
Olympic silver medalists for Finland
Athletes (track and field) at the 1912 Summer Olympics
Athletes (track and field) at the 1920 Summer Olympics
Athletes (track and field) at the 1924 Summer Olympics
Olympic athletes of Finland
Medalists at the 1920 Summer Olympics
Medalists at the 1912 Summer Olympics
Olympic gold medalists in athletics (track and field)
Olympic silver medalists in athletics (track and field)
Finnish emigrants to the United States